The point of junction of the maxillary bone, lacrimal bone, and frontal bone is named the dacryon.

References 

Bones of the head and neck
Musculoskeletal system